Hold, Hold, Fire is the debut studio album by Australian rock band Calling All Cars, released on 12 March 2010. Hold, Hold, Fire was nominated for Best Independent Hard Rock Or Punk Album at the AIR Awards of 2010.

Track listing

Charts

Release history

References

External links
Calling All Cars Myspace

2010 debut albums
Calling All Cars (band) albums
Shock Records albums
Albums produced by Tom Larkin